Louroux-de-Bouble (literally Louroux of Bouble) is a commune in the Allier department in central France.

Geography
The river Bouble flows northeast through the western part of the commune and forms part of its northern border.

Population

See also
Communes of the Allier department

References

Communes of Allier
Allier communes articles needing translation from French Wikipedia